John Anthony Winston (September 4, 1812 – December 21, 1871) was a planter, military officer, and politician who became the 15th Governor of Alabama (1853 to 1857) after serving as president of the state senate (1845–1849). Alabama's first native-born governor, Winston later fought for the Confederate States of America as colonel of the 8th Alabama Infantry early in the American Civil War, and after the conflict was not permitted to assume a seat in the United States Senate.

Early and family life
He was born in 1812 to the former Mary Cooper and her planter husband William Winston in Tuscumbia, in Madison County, then in the Alabama Territory. His grandfather Anthony Winston had represented Buckingham County, Virginia in the House of Burgesses, one of Virginia's Revolutionary Conventions, and as one of its first (part-time) representatives in the Virginia House of Delegates, before becoming a Virginia judge.

Winston received a private education appropriate to his class, including at LaGrange College (now the location of the University of North Alabama) and later in Tennessee at Cumberland College (which later became the University of Nashville). John Anthony Winston married his first cousin, Mary Agness Jones (1819–1835), on August 7, 1832, in Madison County, Alabama. They had only one surviving child, a daughter, Mary Agnes Winston.

Career

Winston, like his father, operated plantations using enslaved labor. He also became Cotton Commissioner, inspecting the state's main export crop.

Legislator and officer
Winston continued his family's tradition of political involvement in 1840, winning an election to the state House of Representatives and re-election in 1842. In 1843 he won election to the state Senate and won re-election until his gubernatorial term described below. Fellow senators elected Winston their president from 1845 to 1849. During his legislative career, Winston also represented Alabama at the 1848 Democratic party convention in Baltimore and the attempted secessionist convention in Nashville in 1850. Although considered a strong southern rights advocate, Winston did not support William Lowndes Yancey's ardent state's rights platform in Baltimore, nor the popular sovereignty compromise at the Nashville meeting.

Meanwhile, in 1846 Winston organized a militia company to fight in the Mexican–American War, but it was never called into active duty.

Governor
Alabama voters elected Winston the 15th Governor of the U.S. state of Alabama, and he won re-election after two years, thus serving from 1853 to 1857. Winston became known as the "veto governor" because he vetoed more than 30 bills, many concerning public support for transportation initiatives, including railroads. Alabama's bank had failed, which caused his particular concern about state finances. However, Winston still encouraged public education and, in 1854, signed a bill creating Alabama's public school system. In 1855 he won re-election by a narrow margin over the Know Nothing party candidate, George D. Shortridge.

Confederate officer
Following Alabama's secession, Winston was colonel of the 8th Alabama Infantry Regiment. His strict discipline did not endear him to his troops. His unit was involved in the Peninsula campaign, most notably the Battle of Seven Pines.

Winston's cousin was the Mississippi's wartime governor, John Jones Pettus, who was born in Wilson County, Tennessee on October 9, 1813, and died in Pulaski County, Arkansas on January 25, 1867. Governor Pettus' wife, Permelia Virginia Winston (1809–1857), was also Winston's sister.

Postwar
Winston won an election as a delegate to the 1865 Alabama Constitutional Convention. In January 1867, he presented his credentials to the United States Senate as Senator-elect from Alabama for 1867–1873. However, he was not permitted to take his seat because he refused to take an oath of allegiance to the United States.

Death and legacy
Winston died December 21, 1871, in Mobile, Alabama and is buried in the Winston Family Cemetery (privately owned) near Gainesville in Sumter County, Alabama, as is Permelia Virginia Winston Pettus.

References

1812 births
1871 deaths
People from Madison County, Alabama
Democratic Party governors of Alabama
19th-century American politicians